Adobe bread, also called oven bread, is a type of bread typical of the Pueblo peoples of the Southwestern United States. The bread is often shaped like animals typical of the region. The dough often contains meat, vegetables, seeds, or nuts. The bread is baked in a beehive-shaped outdoor adobe oven known as an horno.
The basic dough is made with yeast, flour, salt, warm water and a sweetener such as honey or sugar.

See also
 List of American breads

References

American breads
Pueblo culture
Native American cuisine
Cuisine of the Southwestern United States